U.S. Route 231 (US 231) in Kentucky runs  from the Tennessee state line near Adolphus to the William H. Natcher Bridge on the Ohio River (Indiana state line) near Rockport, Indiana. It crosses the state mainly in the west-central region, traversing Allen, Warren, Butler, Ohio, and Daviess Counties.

Route description 
Running concurrently with U.S. Route 31E for its first  in Kentucky, US 231/31E enters the state from Sumner County, Tennessee, and into Allen County. The two routes separate on the west side of Scottsville after the KY 100 junction. US 231 turns northwestward onto a four-lane highway on its way into Warren County, and into Bowling Green. Just before entering the city, US 231 crosses the southern terminus of KY 9007, a short connector providing access to I-65 and I-165. US 231 crosses I-65 in the Greenwood neighborhood of Bowling Green, US 31W and US 68 within city limits, and I-165 on the northwestern edge of the city.

US 231 reaches Butler County to cross I-165 for a second time, and runs concurrently with KY 79 on the southern end of Morgantown. On the northern end of Morgantown, KY 70 joins in on the concurrency as US 231, KY 79, and KY 70 cross the Green River. Both state routes separate from US 231 in the Aberdeen area before crossing the I-165 for a third time before entering Ohio County. US 231 meets U.S. Route 62 in the Beaver Dam/Hartford area after crossing the Wendell H. Ford Western Kentucky Parkway on the south side of Beaver Dam.

US 231 goes further north into Daviess County to join up with US 60 (Wendell H. Ford Expressway) to bypass Owensboro. US 60 splits from US 231 before leaving the state via the William H. Natcher Bridge going into Spencer County, Indiana.

Alternate names 
U.S. 231 has several alternate names throughout its course in Kentucky. They include:
Scottsville Road (Allen/Warren County line to US 231 Bus/KY 880)
Campbell Lane (Bowling Green, from US 231 Bus/KY 880 to US 68/80)
Vietnam Veterans Boulevard (US 68/KY80 to US 231 Bus)
Morgantown Road (Warren County, US 231 Bus/US 68 to Butler-Warren County line)
Bowling Green Road (Butler County south of Morgantown)
South Main Street (Morgantown)
G.L. Smith Street (Morgantown)
Beaver Dam Road (Aberdeen to Butler-Ohio County line)
New Hartford Road (Daviess County, from Ohio County line to US 60)

History 

In Kentucky, US 231 was originally signed as Kentucky Route 71, one of many charter routes of Kentucky's statewide system of highways when it was established in 1929. KY 71 originally ran from downtown Scottsville to downtown Owensboro. Portions of the original KY 71 in Butler County was rerouted to a bridge over the Green River in the early 1950s, replacing the Morgantown Ferry. In 1952, US 231 replaced the designation of KY 71 in its entirety as the U.S. route was extended from the Montgomery, Alabama area into Tennessee, Kentucky and Indiana.

In August 1999, US 231 in Bowling Green was rerouted onto KY 880 (Campbell Lane) from the Scottsville Road intersection to the Morgantown Road intersection on the northwest side of town. The former alignment of US 231 into downtown Bowling Green was redesignated as U.S. 231 Business.

In 2002, US 231 in Daviess County was rerouted onto the then-new William H. Natcher Bridge northeast of Owensboro. It previously followed the current KY 2155 and KY 2262 onto the Owensboro Bridge in downtown Owensboro into Spencer County until the opening of the Natcher Bridge.

The stretch of US 231 from the Natcher Parkway (now I-165) interchange to Bell Street in Morgantown was widened to include a center lane for left-turning in 2013-2014.

Scottsville Road speed limit increase
This makes this stretch of US 231 the second section of a four-lane divided highway with unlimited access in the region with a 65 mph speed limit, the first being US 68/KY 80 from I-24 in Trigg County to the I-165 Exit 5 interchange at Bowling Green.

Major intersections

See also
 
 
U.S. Route 231
Special routes of U.S. Route 231

References

External links

Kentucky Transportation Cabinet
US 231 at KentuckyRoads.com

 Kentucky
31-2
0231
0231
0231
0231
0231